Vella Raja is a 2018 Indian Tamil-language streaming television series, produced as an Original for Amazon Prime Video. The series is directed by Guhan Senniappan of Nalaya Iyakunar and Sawaari fame, produced by S. R. Prabhu under the production banner Dream Warrior Pictures. It is the first Amazon Original in Tamil which was dubbed in both Hindi and Telugu languages. The series was released on Prime Video on 7 December 2018 and received positive reviews from the audience and critics for its making and the screenplay, It stars Bobby Simha, Parvatii Nair and Gayathrie in their streaming series debut, while  Kaali Venkat plays a  pivotal role in the series. Media outlets speculated that the series is inspired by the 2018 Hindi-language Netflix series Sacred Games.

Synopsis
Vella Raja revolves around the lives of characters who land up in trouble while staying at a lodge. How Deva saves himself without getting caught by the police and his rivals forms the rest of the story.

Cast 

 Bobby Simha as Drug Kingpin Deva
 Parvatii Nair as Teresa
 Gayathrie as Aadhira
 Kaali Venkat as Pugazhendi
 Yuthan Balaji as Kathir
 Akash Premkumar as Mohan
 T. M. Karthik as Kamesh
 Manoharan
 Ponmudi
 Sharath Ravi as Saravanan
 Santhosh
 Lallu as Aadira's assistant
 Udayaraj as Drug Peddler
 TSR  as Judge
Abi - Kalki duo

Episodes

Production 
This was the first Tamil series developed by Amazon original. The official teaser of the series was released on 5 December 2018.

The soundtrack for the web film is composed by Vishal Chandrasekhar.

Reception 
Ashameera Aiyappan of The New Indian Express rated the series 2.5 out of 5, praising its "premise and the making". The series was also appreciated for portrayal of the women lead characters in prominent roles.

References

External links 

 

Amazon Prime Video original programming
2018 Tamil-language television series debuts
Tamil-language web series
Tamil-language thriller television series
2018 Tamil-language television series endings